Maduvvaree (Dhivehi: މަޑުއްވަރި) is one of the inhabited islands of Raa Atoll.

Geography

Demography

Education
Raa Atoll Education Centre has a school, called Maduvvaree School, on the island.

References

Islands of the Maldives